Doug Friedman (born September 1, 1971) is an American former professional ice hockey player who played in the American Hockey League (AHL) with two brief stints in the National Hockey League (NHL). Known as an enforcer, Friedman racked up over 1,400 penalty minutes in just under 500 games in the AHL/IHL. He played four years with Boston University in NCAA Division I before beginning his professional career with the Cornwall Aces of the AHL. He was the only player taken from Edmonton in the 1998 NHL Expansion Draft. He finished his career with the Worcester IceCats of the AHL in 2001.

Career
Friedman was selected in the eleventh round of the 1991 NHL Entry Draft, 222nd overall, by the Quebec Nordiques. During the 1993–94 NCAA Division I men's ice hockey season Friedman was voted captain of the Terriers. Friedman had two brief NHL stints, in the 1997–98 and 1998–99 with the Edmonton Oilers and Nashville Predators, primarily as an enforcer.

Following his playing career, Friedman transitioned into coaching. From 2014 to 2018, Friedman was the athletic director of the college-preparatory school Kents Hill and coached the school's ice hockey team. In 2018, Friedman was named the head coach of the United States Premier Hockey League (USPHL) team Twin City Thunder based in Auburn, Maine, and later became the head coach of their National Collegiate Development Conference (NCDC) team. In June 2021, he joined the Danbury Jr. Hat Tricks as head coach of their North American 3 Hockey League (NA3HL) team, but then left the organization a month later for his alma mater as director of hockey operations at Boston University.

Personal life
Friedman grew-up in Cape Elizabeth, Maine. He is married with three children and lives in Readfield, Maine.

Career statistics

References

External links 

1971 births
Living people
American men's ice hockey left wingers
Boston University alumni
Boston University Terriers men's ice hockey players
Cornwall Aces players
Edmonton Oilers players
Hamilton Bulldogs (AHL) players
Hershey Bears players
Ice hockey players from Connecticut
Ice hockey people from Maine
Jewish ice hockey players
Kentucky Thoroughblades players
Milwaukee Admirals (IHL) players
Nashville Predators players
People from Cape Elizabeth, Maine
Sportspeople from Greenwich, Connecticut
Quebec Nordiques draft picks
Worcester IceCats players